Kabyle or Kabylian (native name: Taqbaylit ) is a Berber language spoken by the Kabyle people in the north and northeast of Algeria. It is spoken primarily in Kabylia, east of the capital Algiers and in Algiers itself, but also by various groups near Blida, such as the Beni Salah and Beni Bou Yaqob.(extinct?)

Estimating the number of Berber speakers is very difficult and figures are often contested. A 2004 estimate was that 9.4% of the population speaks Kabyle. The diaspora population has been estimated at 1 million.

Classification

Kabyle is one of the Berber languages, a family within the Afroasiatic languages. It is believed to have broken off very early from Proto-Berber, although after the Zenaga language did so.

Distribution

Geographical distribution 
Kabyle Berber is native to Kabylia. It is present in seven Algerian districts. Approximately one-third of Algerians are Berber-speakers, clustered mostly near Algiers, in Kabylian and Shawi, but with some communities related to Kabyle in the west (Shenwa languages), east and south of the country. The populations of Béjaïa (Bgayet), Bouïra (Tubirett) and Tizi Ouzou (Tizi Wezzu) provinces are in majority Kabyle-speaking. In addition, Kabyle is mainly spoken in the provinces of Boumerdès, and as well as in Bordj Bou Arréridj, Jijel, and in Algiers where it coexists with Algerian Arabic. 

Kabyle Berber is also spoken as a native language among the Algerian Kabyle-descended diaspora in European and North American cities (mainly France). It is estimated that half of Kabyles live outside the Kabylian region.

Number of speakers 
French ethnologist  estimates four million Kabyle speakers in 2001 in Algeria. According to the International Encyclopedia of Linguistics there were  million speakers in Kabylia in 2003 out of  million worldwide. Salem Chaker estimated there were 5.5 million speakers in 2004, including 3 to 3.5 in Kabylia. The Encyclopædia Universalis gives 7 million Kabyle speakers. The French Ministry of Culture estimated there were one million Kabyle speakers in France in 2013. Linguist Matthias Brenzinger estimates the number of Kabyle speakers in Algeria at between 2.5 to 3 million in 2015. Prof. Bruce Maddy-Weitzman's 2018 estimate is more than 5 million Kabyle speakers in Kabylie. Linguist Asya Pereltsvaig gives 5.6 million Kabyle speakers worldwide in 2020, mostly in Algeria. In 2021, Amina Mettouchi, professor of Berber linguistics, estimated the number of speakers at five million worldwide and more than three million in Algeria. In 2022, according to Ethnologue there were  million speakers worldwide, including  million in Algeria.

Dialects

Many identify two dialects: Greater Kabylie (west) and Lesser Kabylie (east), but the reality is more complex than that, Kabyle dialects constitute a dialect continuum that can be divided into four main dialects (from west to east):

Far-western: villages such as Tizi-Ghennif, Boghni and Draa el Mizan.
Western: villages such as At Menguellat, At Yiraten, At Aïssi, At Yanni, 
Eastern: 
 Eastern-West: villages such as At Mlikeche, Eastern-center : At Aïdel, At Khiar
 Eastern-East: villages such as At Sliman.
Far-eastern: villages such as Aokas, Melbou, At Smail. Also known as Tasaḥlit and considered as a separate language by some according to Ethnologue. Mutual intelligibility with Far-western is difficult to absent.

Lexical differences

At the exception of the far-eastern dialect, much of the vocabulary of Kabyle is common among its dialects, though some lexical differences exist, e.g. the word dream in English (from west to east): bargu, argu, argu, bureg.

Status and usage

Multilingualism and language shift 
Almost all Berber speakers are multilingual, in Arabic and often also in French. Kabyle is still strong in villages but Kabyles are increasingly shifting to Arabic in cities. A 2013 study found that half of Kabyles in Oran spoke Arabic to their siblings.

Official status 

After the 2001–02 widespread Kabyle protests known as the Black Spring, the Berber (Amazigh) language (with all its Algerian dialects and varieties) was recognized as a 'national language' in the 2002 Algerian Constitution, but not as an 'official language' until 2016 after a long campaign by activists. The Arabic language is still the only de jure official language of Algeria. French is not recognized in any legal document of Algeria but enjoys a de facto position of an official language as it is used in every Algerian official administration or institution, at all levels of the government, sometimes much more than Arabic.

The Berber (Amazigh) language faces an unfavourable environment, despite a public radio (Channel II, which dates back to the Algerian War), as well as a public TV channel (Channel IV or Tamazight TV). Since private ownership of TV channels is illegal in Algeria, Kabyles have launched a private Kabyle speaking TV channel, called Berbère Television, that broadcasts from France. There is no Kabyle newspaper. Some Algerian newspapers such as  offer a small Kabyle section.

In 1994, Kabyle pupils and students boycotted Algerian schools for a year, demanding the officialization of Berber, leading to the symbolic creation of the "Haut commissariat à l'amazighité" (HCA) in 1995. Berber was subsequently taught as a non-compulsory language in Berber speaking areas. The course being optional, few people attend.

President Bouteflika has frequently stated that "Amazigh (the Berber language) will never be an official language, and if it has to be a national language, it must be submitted to a referendum". In 2005, President Bouteflika, stated that "there is no country in the world with two official languages" and "this will never be the case of Algeria".
Nevertheless, after four decades of pacific struggle, riots, strikes, and social mobilization, including the Berber spring (1980, riots and strikes in the Kabylie region of Tizi Ouzou, Bouira and Bejaïa, as well as Algiers) and the Black Spring in 2001, President Bouteflika and his government stepped back and submitted to the Kabylie pressure by recognising Amazigh (Berber) as a "national language" without a referendum.

In February 2016, the Algerian constitution passed a resolution that made Berber an official language alongside Arabic.

Phonology

The phonemes below reflect the pronunciation of Kabyle.

Vowels
Kabyle has three phonemic vowels:

 is used to write the epenthetic schwa vowel  which occurs frequently in Kabyle. Historically, it is thought to be the result of a pan-Berber reduction or merger of three other vowels.

The phonetic realization of the vowels, especially , is influenced by the character of the surrounding consonants; emphatic consonants invite a more open realization of the vowel, e.g. aẓru =  'stone' vs. amud =  'seed'.

Consonants

Assimilation
In the Kabyle language there are various accents which are the result of assimilations (these accents are generally divided into western and eastern Kabyle). Some of these assimilations are present among all Kabyle "dialects" and some not. These assimilations are not noted in writing, such as:

Axxam n wergaz ("the house of the man") is pronounced either « axxam n wergaz », « axxam bb wergaz » or « axxam pp wergaz ». (N+W=BB)
D taqcict ("it's a girl") is pronounced « tsaqcict ». (D+T=TS)
Here is a list of some of these assimilations: D/T+T=TS, N+W=BB/PP, I+Y=IG.

Gemination affects the quality of certain consonants, turning semivowels and fricatives into stops; in particular, geminated ɣ becomes qq, geminated y becomes gg, and geminated w becomes bb.

Fricatives vs. stops
Kabyle is mostly composed of fricatives, phonemes which are originally stops in other Berber languages, but in writing there is no difference between fricatives and stops. Below is a list of fricatives vs. stops and when they are pronounced (note that gemination turns fricatives into stops).

Writing system

The most ancient Berber writings were written in the Libyco-Berber script, mostly from Numidian and Roman times. This script was an abjad, and is not yet completely deciphered today. Deciphered scripts are mostly funerary, following a simple formula of "X son of Y" (X u Y) which is still used to this day in the Kabyle language. Such writings have been found in Kabylie (also known as Kabylia) and continue to be discovered by archeologists. The Tifinagh script of the Tuaregs was a direct continuation of this earlier script.

The Libyco-Berber alphabet disappeared in the region of Kabylia by the sixth century, when Latin became the official and administrative language in North Africa, as in rest of the former Roman empire.

Kabyle became a mostly spoken language after the Arabic conquest of North Africa, and while many examples of the Kabyle language written in a form of Berber-Arabic script survive, the number of Kabyle texts was relatively much smaller than those written in other Berber languages such as Shilha, Mozabite, and Nafusi.

The first French–Kabyle dictionary was compiled by a French ethnologist in the 18th century. It was written in Latin script with an orthography based on that of French.

However, the Kabyle language really became a written language again in the beginning of the 19th century. Under French influence, Kabyle intellectuals began to use the Latin script. "Tamacahutt n wuccen" by Brahim Zellal was one of the first Kabyle books written using this alphabet.

After the independence of Algeria, some Kabyle activists tried to revive the Libyco-Berber script, which is still in use by the Tuareg. Attempts were made to modernize the writing system by modifying the shape of the letters and by adding vowels. This new version of Tifinagh has been called Neo-Tifinagh and has been adopted as the official script for Berber languages in Morocco. However, a majority of Berber activists (both in Morocco and Algeria) prefer the Latin script and see the Tifinagh as a hindrance to literacy in Berber. Kabyle literature continues to be written in Latin script. The use of Tifinagh is limited to logos.

Mouloud Mammeri codified a new orthography for the Kabyle language which avoided using French orthography. His script has been adopted by all Berber linguists, the INALCO, and the Algerian HCA. It uses diacritics and two letters from the extended Latin alphabet: Čč Ḍḍ Ɛɛ Ǧǧ Ɣɣ Ḥḥ Ṣṣ Ṭṭ Ẓẓ.

Grammar

Nouns

Kabyle has two genders: masculine and feminine. As in most Berber languages, masculine nouns and adjectives generally start with a vowel (a-, i-, u-), while feminine nouns generally start with t- and end with a -t, e.g. aqcic 'boy' vs. taqcict 'girl'.

Plurals generally are formed by replacing initial a- with i-, and either suffixing -en ("regular/external" plurals), changing vowels within the word ("broken/internal" plurals), or both. Examples: 
argaz → irgazen "men"
adrar → idurar "mountains"
afus → ifassen "hands"

As in all Berber languages, Kabyle has two types of states or cases of the noun: free state and construct state (or 'annexed state'). The free state is morphologically unmarked. The construct state is derived either by changing initial /a-/ to /u-/, loss of initial vowel in some feminine nouns, addition of a semi-vowel word-initially, or in some cases no change occurs at all:
adrar → wedrar "mountain"
tamdint → temdint "town"
tamurt → tmurt "country"
asif → wasif "river"
iles → yiles "tongue"
taddart → taddart "village"

As in Central Morocco Tamazight, construct state is used for subjects placed after their verbs, after prepositions, in noun complement constructions, and after certain numerals. Kabyle also places nouns in construct state when they head a noun phrase containing a co-referential bound pronoun earlier in the utterance.

Examples:

Free: Yewwet aqcic. "He has beaten a boy". (Verb–object)
Annexed: Yewwet weqcic. "The boy has beaten". (Verb–subject)

After a preposition (with the exception of "ar" and "s"), all nouns take their annexed state:

Free state: Aman (water), Kas n waman (a glass of water).

Verbs 

Verbs are conjugated for three tenses: the preterite (past), intensive aorist (present perfect, present continuous, past continuous) and the future (ad+aorist). Unlike other Berber languages, the aorist alone is rarely used in Kabyle (in the other languages it is used to express the present).

"Weak verbs" have a preterite form that is the same as their aorist. Examples of weak verbs that follow are conjugated at the first person of the singular:

"Strong verbs" or "irregular verbs":

Verbs are conjugated for person by adding affixes. These suffixes are static and identical for all tenses (only the theme changes). The epenthetic vowel e may be inserted between the affix and the verb. Verbs are always marked for subject and may also inflect for person of direct and indirect object.

Examples:
 « Yuɣ-it. » – "He bought it." (He.bought-it)
 « Yenna-yas. » – "He said to him." (He.said-to.him)
 « Yefka-yas-t. » – "He gave it to him." (He.gave-to.him-it)

Kabyle is a satellite-framed based language, Kabyle verbs use two particles to show the path of motion:
d orients toward the speaker, and could be translated as "here".
n orients toward the interlocutor or toward a certain place, and could be translated as "there".

Examples:
 « iruḥ-d » (he came), « iruḥ-n » (he went).
 « awi-d aman» (bring the water), « awi-n aman » (carry away the water).

Kabyle usually expresses negation in two parts, with the particle ur attached to the verb, and one or more negative words that modify the verb or one of its arguments. For example, simple verbal negation is expressed by « ur » before the verb and the particle « ara » after the verb:
« Urareɣ » ("I played") → « Ur urareɣ ara » ("I did not play")
Other negative words (acemma... etc.) are used in combination with ur to express more complex types of negation. This system developed via Jespersen's cycle.

Verb derivation is performed by adding affixes. There are three types of derivation forms: causative, reflexive and passive.

Causative: obtained by prefixing the verb with s- / sse- / ssu-:
ffeɣ "to go out" → ssuffeɣ "to make to go out"
kcem "to enter" → ssekcem "to make to enter, to introduce"
irid "to be washed" → ssired "to wash".
Reflexive: obtained by prefixing the verb with m- / my(e)- / myu-:
ẓer "to see" → mẓer "to see each other"
ṭṭef "to hold" → myuṭṭaf "to hold each other".
Passive: is obtained by prefixing the verb with ttu- / ttwa- / tt- / mm(e)- / n- / nn-:
krez "to plough" → ttwakrez "to be ploughed"
ečč "to eat" → mmečč "to be eaten".
Complex forms: obtained by combining two or more of the previous prefixes:
enɣ "to kill" → mmenɣ "to kill each other" → smenɣ "to make to kill each other"
Two prefixes can cancel each other:
enz "to be sold" → zzenz "to sell" → ttuzenz "to be sold" (ttuzenz = enz !!).

Every verb has a corresponding agent noun. In English it could be translated into verb+er. It is obtained by prefixing the verb with « am- » or with « an- » if the first letter is b / f / m / w (there are exceptions, however).

Examples:
ṭṭef "to hold" → anaṭṭaf "holder"
inig "to travel" → iminig "traveller"
eks "to graze" → ameksa "shepherd"

Verbal nouns are derived differently from different classes of verbal stems (including 'quality verbs'). Often a- or t(u)- is prefixed:
ffer "to hide" → tuffra "hiding" (stem VI), « Tuffra n tidett ur telhi » – "Hiding the truth is bad".
ɣeẓẓ "to bite" → aɣẓaẓ
zdi "to be united" → azday
ini "to say" → timenna

Pronouns 
Pronouns may either occur as standalone words or bound to nouns or verbs.

Example: « Ula d nekk. » – "Me too."

Possessive pronouns are bound to the modified noun.

Example : « Axxam-nneɣ. » – "Our house." (House-our)

There are three demonstratives, near-deictic ('this, these'), far-deictic ('that, those') and absence. They may either be suffixed to nouns, or appear in isolation. Examples: « Axxam-a / Axxam-agi» – "This house.", (House-this), «Wagi yelha» – "This is nice." (This is-nice).

Prepositions
Prepositions precede their objects: « i medden » "to the people", « si taddart » "from the village". All words preceded by a preposition (except « s » and « ar », "towards", "until" ) take the annexed state.

Some prepositions have two forms: one is used with pronominal suffixes and the other form is used in all other contexts, e.g. ger 'between' → gar.

Some prepositions have a corresponding relative pronoun (or interrogative), for example: 
« i » "for/to" → « iwumi » "to whom"
« Tefka aksum i wemcic » "she gave meat to the cat" → « Amcic iwumi tefka aksum » "The cat to whom she gave meat."

Syntax 
Negation

Predicative particle 'd'

The predicative particle 'd' is an indispensable tool in speaking Kabyle (or any other Amazigh language). "d" is equivalent to both "it is + adjective" and "to be + adjective", but cannot be replaced by the verb "ili" (to be).  It is always followed by a noun in free state.

Examples:
D taqcict 'it's a girl'
D nekk 'it's me'
Nekk d argaz 'I'm a man'
Idir d anelmad 'Idir is a student'
Idir yella d anelmad 'Idir was a student'

The predicative particle "d" should not be confused with the particle of coordination "d"; indeed, the latter is followed by a noun at its annexed state while the first is always followed by a noun at its free state.

Vocabulary
Kabyle has absorbed some Arabic, French, Latin, Greek and Punic vocabulary. According to Salem Chaker, Arabic loanwords represent 35% of the total Kabyle vocabulary; the number of French loanwords has not been studied yet. These loanwords are sometimes Berberized and sometimes kept in their original form. The Berberized words follow the regular grammar of Kabyle (free and annexed state).

Examples of Berberized Arabic or French words:

kitāb (Ar.) > taktabt "book"
machine (Fr.) > tamacint "machine"

Many loanwords from Arabic have often a different meaning in Kabyle:

al-māl "property" (Ar.) > lmal "domestic animals" (cf. the etymologies of English cattle and fee)

All verbs of Arabic origin follow a Berber conjugation and verbal derivation:

 fahim (Ar.) > fhem "to understand" > ssefhem "to explain".

There are yiwen (f. yiwet) "one", sin (f. snat) "two". The noun being counted follows it in the genitive: sin n yirgazen "two men".

Sample text
In Moulieras (Auguste), Les fourberies de Si Djeh'a.

Note: the predicative particle d was translated as "it.is", the particle of direction d was translated as "here".

Notes

References

Bibliography
Achab, R. : 1996 – La néologie lexicale berbère (1945–1995), Paris/Louvain, Editions Peeters, 1996.
Achab, R. : 1998 – Langue berbère. Introduction à la notation usuelle en caractères latins, Paris, Editions Hoggar.
F. Amazit-Hamidchi & M. Lounaci : Kabyle de poche, Assimil, France, 
  
 
 Dallet, Jean-Marie. 1982. Dictionnaire kabyle–français, parler des At Mangellet, Algérie. Études etholinguistiques Maghreb–Sahara 1, ser. eds. Salem Chaker, and Marceau Gast. Paris: Société d'études linguistiques et anthropologiques de France.
 Hamid Hamouma. n.d. Manuel de grammaire berbère (kabyle). Paris: Edition Association de Culture Berbère.
 Kamal Nait-Zerrad. Grammaire moderne du kabyle, tajerrumt tatrart n teqbaylit. Editions KARTHALA, 2001. 
 
Mammeri, M. : 1976 – Tajerrumt n tmaziɣt (tantala taqbaylit), Maspero, Paris.
Naït-Zerrad, K. : 1994 – Manuel de conjugaison kabyle (le verbe en berbère), L’Harmattan, Paris.
Naït-Zerrad, K. : 1995 – Grammaire du berbère contemporain, I – Morphologie, ENAG, Alger.
 
Tizi-Wwuccen. Méthode audio-visuelle de langue berbère (kabyle), Aix-en-Provence, Edisud, 1986.

External links

INALCO report on Kabyle
Negative Preterite, The negative preterite in Kabyle Berber.

Northern Berber languages

Languages of Algeria